Peru (also Romanized as Perū, Paru, and Poroo) is a village in Kharqan Rural District, Bastam District, Shahrud County, Semnan Province, Iran. At the 2006 census, its population was 2,171, in 606 families. It is less known due to the village namesake is similar to South American country Peru.

References 

Populated places in Shahrud County